Seh Rahi Khovis (also Romanized as Seh Rāhī Khovīs) is a village in Shavur Rural District, Shavur District, Shush County, Khuzestan Province, Iran. At the 2006 census, its population was 113, in 18 families.

References 

Populated places in Shush County